Kyle Johnathan Peterson (born April 9, 1976) is a former Major League Baseball pitcher who played for the Milwaukee Brewers in 1999 and 2001.

Amateur career
Peterson played college baseball at Stanford University. In 1995 and 1996, he played collegiate summer baseball with the Cotuit Kettleers of the Cape Cod Baseball League.

Professional career
Peterson was drafted by the Brewers as the 13th overall pick in the first round of the 1997 MLB Draft. He made his major league debut in 1999. After that season, he did not again play in the majors until 2001. While in the minors with the Triple-A Indianapolis Indians in 2001, Peterson was one of four players profiled in the documentary film "A Player To Be Named Later". He retired from the game after 2002.

Broadcasting career
Upon retirement, Peterson joined ESPN as an analyst on College, Major League and Little League events. Since 2003, Peterson has covered the College World Series, Little League World Series, and Major League playoffs. Peterson now works as an analyst for the SEC Network.

References

External links

1976 births
Living people
Major League Baseball pitchers
Cotuit Kettleers players
Ogden Raptors players
Stockton Ports players
El Paso Diablos players
Louisville Redbirds players
Louisville RiverBats players
Beloit Snappers players
Huntsville Stars players
Indianapolis Indians players
Milwaukee Brewers players
Baseball players from Nebraska
People from Douglas County, Nebraska
Major League Baseball broadcasters
College baseball announcers in the United States
Stanford Cardinal baseball players